Laird Maurice Wilcox is an American researcher of political fringe movements. He is the founder of the Wilcox Collection of Contemporary Political Movements, housed in the Kenneth Spencer Research Library at the University of Kansas.

Early life
Wilcox was raised in a family with, as he described, "political intensity". His relatives' politics ranged from socialist to membership in the far-right John Birch Society. Wilcox's father was a construction accountant. His family moved frequently.

Wilcox attended the University of Kansas. He joined the Students for a Democratic Society and later dropped out of college.

While living in Olathe, Kansas, he worked as carpenter, investigator and writer.

Wilcox Collection of Contemporary Political Movements
In 1965, after Wilcox had accumulated four file drawers of literature about radical political movements, some since his teens, the University of Kansas library bought a portion of it for $1,000. The collection, now called the Wilcox Collection of Contemporary Political Movements, is kept in the Kansas Collection of Kenneth Spencer Research Library. It includes literature relating to, according to the university, "more than 10,000 individuals and organizations. The bulk of the collection covers 1960 to the present and comprises nearly 10,000 books, pamphlets and periodicals, 800 audio tapes,  of manuscript materials and more than 100,000 pieces of ephemera including flyers, brochures, mailings, clippings and bumper stickers." From then through at least 1992, Wilcox continued sending two or three boxes each month to add to the collection. In 1986 Reason magazine described the collection as among the largest archives of extremist material.

Views 
In 1968, Wilcox signed the "Writers and Editors War Tax Protest" pledge, vowing to refuse tax payments in protest against the Vietnam War. He has been a member of the American Civil Liberties Union since 1961 and a member of Amnesty International since 1970. Historian George Michael described Wilcox in 2003 as a left-wing libertarian.

In his 1997 self-published book The Watchdogs, Wilcox criticized an "anti-racist industry" of groups monitoring extremism, writing that their "identity and livelihood depend upon growth and expansion of their particular kind of victimization". Wilcox accused groups including the Southern Poverty Law Center (SPLC), the Anti-Defamation League (ADL), and Political Research Associates of a "massive extortion racket" to exaggerate threats from right-wing extremists, whom he estimated at 10,000 in a total US population of 270 million. In response, Mark Potok of the SPLC said that Wilcox "had an ax to grind for a great many years", and Chip Berlet of Political Research Associates said that Wilcox "is not an accurate or ethical reporter".  Historian George Michael noted that Wilcox's examination of memoranda indicated a close working relationship between the ADL and the FBI.

Awards 
In 1989, Wilcox received the Kansas City Area Archivists Award of Excellence for founding and maintaining the Wilcox Collection. He was awarded the Myers Center Award in 1993 for the Study of Human Rights in the United States, and in 1994 he was awarded the Freedom of Information Award of the Kansas Library Association/SIRS "for outstanding commitment to intellectual freedom".

In 1995, he received the Mencken Award of the Free Press Association "for outstanding journalism in defense of liberty". In 2005, the University of Kansas honored Wilcox, then 63, in the Spencer library's North Gallery for his role in founding the Wilcox Collection.

Publications

Periodicals
 Guide to the American Left, annual. Kansas City, Mo.: Editorial Research Service (1984–). . 
 Guide to the American Right, annual. Kansas City, Mo.: Editorial Research Service (1984–). . .

Books
 Nazis, Communists, Klansmen, and Others on the Fringe, with John George. Amherst, NY: Prometheus Books (1992). .
 Crying Wolf: Hate Crime Hoaxes in America. Olathe, Kan.: Editorial Research Service (1994). .
 25th Anniversary Edition, 1994-2019. Olathe, Kan.: Editorial Research Service (2019).
 Be Reasonable: Selected Quotations for Inquiring Minds, with John George. Amherst, NY: Prometheus Books (1995). .
 American Extremists: Militias, Supremacists, Klansmen, Communists & Others. with John George. Amherst, NY: Prometheus Books (1996). .
 The Watchdogs: A Close Look at Anti-Racist "Watchdog" Groups. Olathe, Kan.: Editorial Research Service (1997). .

References

Further reading
 Farney, Dennis (Apr. 27, 1995). "Emergence of Extremist Groups Reflects Changing U. S. Society, Researcher Says."  Wall Street Journal. p. B2.

External links
Official website + blog
Wilcox Collection at C-SPAN
 Wilcox Collection of Contemporary Political Movements at Kenneth Spencer Research Library, University of Kansas

Year of birth missing (living people)
Living people
American social sciences writers
American tax resisters
American political writers
Writers from Kansas